The Dubrovnik Prayer Book is "liber horarum" type of prayer book. This type of prayer book was the most popular religious book for the laity until the beginning of 17th century. The prayer book was printed in August 1512, in Venice. It is printed in Bosnian Cyrillic. Book was discovered to the public in 1932. According to Milan Rešetar which made analysis of script, content, spelling, and language led him to conclude that "the Cyrillic alphabet which is used in the manuscript was not intended for the Orthodox Church or the Orthodox faith, Cyrillic alphabet which is part of that manuscript was regularly used by our Catholics and Muslims".

In 1512 Frančesko Micalović printed two Catholic prayer books in Venice, in the printing house of Giorgio Rusconi (Zorzi Ruskoni) of Milan. One of them being Dubrovnik Prayer Book (Officio Sanctae Brigittae). Both books were printed in Cyrillic script with elements of Glagolitic in Shtokavian dialect after being translated from Chakavian. In the contract signed by Micalović the language of the prayer book was referred to as in littera et idiomate serviano ''.
On 18 September 1512, immediately after his return to Ragusa, Micalović stated that two cases of Slavic books belonged to Đuro, father of Petar Šušić.

The four-part icon from church in the Orthodox Monastery of Virgin Mary's Birth in village Sogle, Čaška Municipality (near Veles, North Macedonia) have decorative elements painted under influence of Cyrillic Prayer Book printed by Micalović. According to Dejan Medaković, renaissance decorative elements of this 16th-century icon are directly copied from Prayer Book printed by Micalović.

According to Milan Rešetar members this historical and literary monument is especially valuable because it reveals the Slavic culture in Dubrovnik as Serbian (even though it is Catholic).

References

Sources
 
 
 
 

1512 books
Republic of Ragusa
Serbian Roman Catholics
Cyrillo-Methodian studies
Bosnian Cyrillic texts